also known as Gazula the amicable Monster, Gudzulla or So It's Gudzulla, is a comedy manga series which was serialized on Weekly Shōnen Sunday in 1967. The manga was based on Hiroshi Sasagawa's one-shot "Onboro Kaijū Guzura" published in the same magazine the previous year as the clumsy and straightforward character of Guzura was very popular at the time.

Later a 52-episode comedy anime adaptation of the series, directed by Hiroshi Sasagawa and produced by Tatsunoko Productions, was aired on Fuji TV between 7 October 1967 and 25 September 1968.

The anime was remade into a 44-episode series also directed by Sasagawa. The remake aired on TV Tokyo between  October 12, 1987, and September 30, 1988.

Plot
One day Mt. Bikkura erupts and blows up a huge egg, which hatches a funny little monster named Guzura. Astray in the human world, he is surprised and puzzled as everything he hears and sees is so strange and wonderful, and he is involved in odd affairs one after another. Besides, people around him are often drawn into humorous troubles. He has a magic ability to eat metal and produce a variety of mechanical devices. Also, he can blow flames out of his mouth and jump high using his powerful tail. Yet he is so innocent and friendly that he becomes popular wherever he goes.

Localization
The original black-and-white series was aired on Australia in 1971 under the title Gazula the Amicable Monster. Guzura and Bonta were renamed "Gazula" and "Oshio" respectively. The anime series was aired in Australia's Nine Network.
The 1987 remake series was aired internationally, such as on France where it was shown under the name "Gozura" and on Italy where it was shown under the name "Il mio amico Guz".

Cast

Toru Ohira as Guzura
Mie Azuma as Bonta
Yoshiko Matsuo as Susuko
Kei Tomiyama as Papa
Mitsuko Asou as Mama

References

External links
 
 

1967 anime television series debuts
1987 anime television series debuts
Comedy anime and manga
Dinosaurs in anime and manga
Fuji TV original programming
Tatsunoko Production
Animated television series about dinosaurs
TV Tokyo original programming